Akosa is an African surname that may refer to the following notable people:
Agyeman Badu Akosa (born 1953), Ghanaian pathologist, politician and social commentator
George Akosa Ghanaian politician
Titilope Gbemisola Akosa, Nigerian environmentalist, climate justice advocate and lawyer